"Good Boys" is a song by American rock band Blondie. Issued on August 11, 2003, it was the only single released from their eighth studio album, The Curse of Blondie (2003). The single was released as part of a two-CD set and on 12-inch vinyl. CD 1 features live versions of "Maria" and "Rapture", plus the video for "Good Boys" directed by Jonas Åkerlund. CD 2 features a remix by Giorgio Moroder. The 12-inch vinyl features remixes by Giorgio Moroder, Arthur Baker, and Scissor Sisters.

"Good Boys" charted at number seven on the US Billboard Hot Dance Club Play chart and peaked at number 12 in the United Kingdom. The Australian single release coincided with the band's 2003 tour of the country, peaking at number 37 and becoming their first top-40 hit there as a group since "Island of Lost Souls" in 1982. "Good Boys" was the final single from the band for almost eight years.

Songwriting credits
Although not credited on the original single release, Brian May of the British rock band Queen was later credited as a co-writer because Debbie Harry used lyrics that were similar to those of Queen's 1977 hit "We Will Rock You" for the rap section. Although the lyrics are not entirely identical, Queen threatened to sue, as was explained by Harry and fellow Blondie member Chris Stein on a VH1 special. The lyrics used in "Good Boys" were "You got me on your face / A big disgrace / Shakin' your feathers all over the place." While the lyrics from "We Will Rock You" are "You got mud on your face / You big disgrace / Kicking your can all over the place."

Music video
The music video for "Good Boys" was directed by Jonas Åkerlund. Filmed partly in black and white and partly in color, the video starts out in the style of an old silent film, with a title screen that presents the band, the song, and the director. Debbie Harry appears in a brunette wig, playing a ringmaster conducting the band in a vintage circus setting, intercut with scenes of a circus drama in which a clown is thrown inside a cage with a tiger and mauled to death. There's also a "blond" version, where Harry doesn't wear the brunette wig. Åkerlund also made an eight-minute silent short film also entitled "Good Boys" extending the clown story.

Track listings
All tracks were written by Deborah Harry, Kevin Griffin, and Brian May unless otherwise noted.

US promo CD (SANDJ-85600-2)
 "Good Boys" (radio edit) – 3:36
 "Good Boys" (album version) – 4:18

UK 12-inch single (674399 6)
A1. "Good Boys" (Giorgio Moroder extended long) – 7:07
B1. "Good Boys" (Scissor Sisters' Gyad Byas Myax Ya mix) – 3:40
B2. "Good Boys" (Return to New York mix) – 8:22

UK CD1 (674399 2)
 "Good Boys" (album version) – 4:18
 "Maria" (live)  – 4:49
 "Rapture (live)  – 6:24
 "Good Boys" (video—B&W version with color) – 3:47

UK CD2 (674399 5)
 "Good Boys" (album version) – 4:18
 "Good Boys" (Giorgio Moroder extended long) – 7:07

European CD single (EPC 674065 2)
 "Good Boys" (album version) – 4:18
 "Good Boys" (Giorgio Moroder extended long) – 7:07
 "Good Boys" (Scissor Sisters' Gyad Byas Myax Ya mix) – 3:40
 "Good Boys" (Return to New York mix) – 8:22

Australian CD (674065 5)
 "Good Boys" (album version) – 4:18
 "Good Boys" (Giorgio Moroder single mix) – 4:06
 "Good Boys" (Dead Guy's Ghost remix) – 7:14
 "Good Boys" (Scissor Sisters' Gyad Byas Myax Ya mix extended) – 5:15

Charts

Release history

References

2003 singles
Blondie (band) songs
Music videos directed by Jonas Åkerlund
Songs written by Kevin Griffin
Songs written by Debbie Harry
Songs written by Brian May
Epic Records singles
Songs involved in plagiarism controversies